The Secret Diary of Sigmund Freud is a 1984 American comedy film directed by Danford B. Greene and starring Bud Cort.

Cast
 Bud Cort as Sigmund Freud
 Carol Kane as Martha Bernays
 Klaus Kinski as Dr. Max Bauer
 Marisa Berenson as Emma Herrmann
 Carroll Baker as Mama Freud
 Ferdy Mayne as Herr Herrmann
 Dick Shawn as The Ultimate Patient
 Nikola Simic as Papa Freud
 Rade Marković as Dr. Schtupmann
 Stevo Žigon as Professor Eberhardt
 Borivoje Stojanović as Professor von Schmertz
 Janez Vrhovec as Professor Gruber

References

External links
 
 
 

1984 films
1984 comedy films
American comedy films
20th Century Fox films
Films set in the 19th century
Films set in Vienna
Cultural depictions of Sigmund Freud
1980s English-language films
1980s American films